The Alto Amazonas Province  is one of the eight provinces in the Loreto Region of Peru. Located in the northeastern Peruvian Amazon, the culturally and biodiverse Province of Alto Amazonas is divided into six districts. Per August 1, 2005 (law Nº 8593), the following five districts were reallocated to the newly created province Datem del Marañón: Barranca, Cahuapanas, Manseriche, Morona, Pastaza.

Political division 
The province measures ] and is divided into six districts:

References 
  Municipalidades del Peru, Municipalidades del Departamento de Loreto, retrieved June 24, 2008.

External links 
  Municipal website

Provinces of the Loreto Region